TN3270 Plus is a terminal emulator for Microsoft Windows. It is used for connecting Windows PC users to IBM mainframe, IBM i and UNIX systems via TCP/IP. TN3270 Plus includes terminal emulation for 3270, 5250, VT100, VT220 and ANSI terminals.

TN3270 Plus supports Windows 8, Server 2012, 7, Vista, Server 2008 and XP. Users can configure the desktop interface to the required specifications with keyboard mapping, color definition and customizable ASCII to EBCDIC translation tables.

References

External links
 
 Hoover Company Profile of SDI USA

Terminal emulators
Mainframe computers
Telnet
Utilities for Windows